Laurence Clark (born 1949) is a New Zealand cartoonist and illustrator.

He started his career in illustration in 1967 at the New Zealand Herald. He was the political cartoonist there from 1987 to 1996 and now freelances from Northland and is the Northern Advocate's editorial cartoonist. He publishes his cartoons under the name of "Klarc".

Bibliography
10,000 years of beer: more or less (c2007)

References

External links
klarc.co.nz - Laurence Clark's website
New Zealand Cartoon Gallery - the latest cartoons from Clark
Search for works by Laurence Clark on DigitalNZ.

1949 births
Living people
New Zealand cartoonists